Captain The Hon. Fergus Bowes-Lyon (18 April 1889 – 27 September 1915) was a British officer and older brother of Elizabeth Bowes-Lyon, Queen consort of the United Kingdom from 1936 until 1952, and generally known in Britain as the Queen Mother. Bowes-Lyon was killed during World War I. He was a maternal uncle of Elizabeth II.

Early life and marriage

Fergus was born at Forbes House in Ham, Surrey the son of Claude Bowes-Lyon, 14th Earl of Strathmore and Kinghorne, and his wife, Cecilia Cavendish-Bentinck.

Bowes-Lyon had his early education at Ludgrove School. He later attended Eton College. He was a keen cricketer and played in the annual autumn fixtures held at the cricket ground at Glamis Castle.

On 17 September 1914, he married Lady Christian Norah Dawson-Damer (7 August 1890 – 29 March 1959), daughter of the 5th Earl of Portarlington. Their daughter, Rosemary, was born the following year. Rosemary was only two months old when Fergus died in the line of duty on 27 September 1915, only 10 days after the first anniversary of his wedding. His issue:
 Rosemary Luisa Bowes-Lyon (18 July 1915 – 18 January 1989) married Edward Wilfred George Joicey-Cecil (14 January 1912 – 6 October 1985) on 28 April 1945. They have two children and four grandchildren:
 James David Edward Joicey-Cecil (24 September 1946) he married Jane Susanna Brydon Adeley on 5 April 1975. They have two daughters:
 Elizabeth Anne Joicey-Cecil (8 February 1950) she married Alastair Richard Malcolm on 16 March 1971. They have two sons:

World War I 

In the First World War he served with the 8th Battalion, Black Watch: as a lieutenant since 19th August 1914, and as temporary captain since November 17th. Alfred Anderson, later the last surviving Scottish soldier of the conflict (and the last surviving British soldier to have been awarded the 1914 Star), was his batman.

Bowes-Lyon was killed during the Battle of the Hohenzollern Redoubt in the Battle of Loos. As he led an attack on the German lines, his leg was blown off by a barrage of German artillery and he fell back into his sergeant's arms. Bullets struck him in the chest and shoulder and he died on the field. He was buried in a quarry at Vermelles, but although the quarry was adopted as a war cemetery, the details of his grave were lost, and so he was recorded among the names of the missing on the Loos Memorial.

At the time of his death his brother John was also serving with the Black Watch. His younger brother Michael was at home recovering from wounds and his eldest brother, Lord Glamis, had recently left the Black Watch after being wounded. His mother, Cecilia Bowes-Lyon, Countess of Strathmore and Kinghorne, was severely affected by the loss of her son, and after his death became an invalid, withdrawn from public life until the marriage of her daughter Elizabeth to the future king in 1923. Fergus's widow later married Captain William Frederick Martin (d. 6 October 1947). His widow died on 29 March 1959, aged 68.

In November 2011 his grandson supplied family records to the Commonwealth War Graves Commission detailing his original burial place, and showing that it had remained marked until the end of the war.  As a result, in August 2012 his place of commemoration was moved to the Quarry Cemetery, Auchy-les-Mines, marked by a headstone inscribed with his details and the words "Buried near this spot" as the precise location of the grave is still not known.

Ancestry

Sources 

1889 births
1915 deaths
British Army personnel of World War I
Fergus Bowes-Lyon
Black Watch officers
British military personnel killed in World War I
Younger sons of earls
People educated at Eton College
Military personnel from Surrey
People from Ham, London
People educated at Ludgrove School
Burials in Hauts-de-France